Laxmanrao Mankar (b 1929) was an Indian politician, belonging to right wing Jana Sangh and its successor Bharatiya Janata Party. 

He contested assembly elections from  Amgaon in 1962,1967, 1972, emerging victorious in 1967. He was a member of the 6th Lok Sabha of India (1977-1980) from Bhandara constituency of Maharashtra. He was the losing candidate from Bhandara in 1980 and 1985 for Bharatiya Janata Party.

References

India MPs 1977–1979
Living people
Marathi politicians
Bharatiya Lok Dal politicians
Janata Party politicians
Lok Sabha members from Maharashtra
People from Bhandara district
Year of birth missing (living people)
Bharatiya Janata Party politicians from Maharashtra